Alexander Charles Ewald (1842–1891) was an English civil servant, known as a historical writer.

Life
He was born at Jerusalem, the son of Christian Ferdinand Ewald (1802–1874), who from a Jewish family became a Christian convert working for the London Society for Propagating the Gospel among the Jews. He was educated abroad and was appointed to a clerkship in the Public Record Office in 1861, rising to be senior clerk by 1890. He died at 31 Victoria Road, Upper Norwood, on 20 June 1891.

Works
While at the Public Record Office, Ewald was mainly responsible for the completion of the work begun by Thomas Duffus Hardy in 1835: a full calendar and précis of the Norman Rolls-Henry V. It was printed in vols. xli. and xlii. of the Deputy-keeper's Reports (1880 and 1881), and supplemented by a glossary prepared by Ewald. He also wrote less technical historical works, including:

 A Reference Book of English History, 1866 and 1867. 
 Our Constitution: an Epitome of our Chief Laws and System of Government, 1867. 
 The Last Century of Universal History (1767–1867), 1868. 
 Our Public Records: a Brief Handbook to the National Archives, 1873. 
 Life and Times of Algernon Sydney, 1873, 2 vols. 
 Life and Times of Prince Charles Stuart, Count of Albany, 1875 and 1883, 2 vols. 
 Sir Robert Walpole: a Political Biography, 1877.
 Representative Statesmen, 1879, 2 vols. 
 Stories from the State Papers, 1881, 2 vols. 
 The Rt. Hon. Benjamin Disraeli and his Times, 1883, 2 vols. 
 Leaders of the Senate: a Biographical History of the Rise and Development of the British Constitution, 1884–5, 2 vols. 
 Studies Re-studied: Historical Sketches from Original Sources, 1885.
 The Life of Sir Joseph Napier, Bart., 1887. 
 Paper and Parchment (Record Office Studies), 1890.

Notes

Attribution

1842 births
1891 deaths
19th-century British historians
Contributors to the Dictionary of National Biography